Electro Sport Clube do Lobito or simply Electro do Lobito is an Angolan multisports club based in Lobito, Benguela. The club's handball team competes at the local level, at the Benguela Provincial Handball Championship and at the Angola Women's Handball League.

The club is named after its major sponsor, the Angolan Public Electricity Company.

Honours

National Championship:
Winner (0): 
 Runner Up (0) :

Angola Cup:
Winner (0): 
 Runner Up (0) :

Angola Super Cup:
Winner (0): 
 Runner Up (0) :

CHAB Club Champions Cup:
Winner (0): 
 Runner Up (0) :

CHAB Babacar Fall Super Cup:
Winner (0): 
 Runner Up (0) :

CHAB Cup Winner's Cup:
Winner (0): 
 Runner Up (0) :

Squad

Players

Manager history
  José Pereira (coach)|José Pereira Kidó 2008
  Fernando Luís (coach)|Fernando Luís 2010
  Fernando Xavier 2011
  Alex Fernandes 2014, 2015, 2016

See also
Federação Angolana de Andebol

References

Sports clubs in Angola
Angolan handball clubs
Benguela Province